Bruno Šundov (born February 10, 1980) is a retired Croatian professional basketball player. Standing at 2.21 m (7 ft 3 in), he played the center position. He played for five different NBA teams and over 20 clubs around the world.

Professional career
Šundov was a second-round draft pick of the Dallas Mavericks in the 1998 NBA draft, aged only 18, and played sparingly for a number of teams during a seven-year spell: the Mavericks (1998–2000), Indiana Pacers (2000–02), Boston Celtics (2002–03), Cleveland Cavaliers (2003–04) and the New York Knicks (January 2004 and 2004–05). He averaged 1.7 points and one rebound per game over his NBA career.

Šundov also played with the Israeli league club Maccabi Tel Aviv in February 2004, and with RBC Verviers-Pepinster in the Basketball League Belgium in May later that year.
 
In September 2005, after leaving the NBA, he signed with the Spanish club Etosa Alicante, and two seasons later he joined five times-in-a-row Cyprus national championship club Proteas EKA AEL, being crucial in the team's success in the Eurocup campaign, where the club finished in third place.

In February 2008, Šundov was signed by the Spanish ACB league club Grupo Begar León, which was eventually relegated after the 2007–08 ACB season. In September 2008, he joined ASK Riga in the Baltic League and, later that season moved to Adriatic League team Cibona Zagreb. He ended that season with Menorca Bàsquet in Spain, then joined Donetsk. When the latter team went bankrupt in January 2010, Sundov signed with Kavala of the Greek League.

In September 2010 he signed a one-month contract with Valencia BC in Spain which was not extended. In January 2011, Sundov signed with the Bulgarian team PBC Lukoil Academic.

The Rain or Shine Elasto Painters selected Sundov as an import for the 2013 Philippine Basketball Association's Commissioner's Cup; he is the first European (and European-born) player to play as an import in the PBA. Later in 2013, Sundov signed with Al Shabab in the United Arab Emirates. In February 2014, he signed with Jászberényi KSE of Hungary.

In November 2014, he signed with his former club Lukoil Academic for the 2014–15 season. In late November 2015, he signed with Al-Ahli of the Bahraini Premier League. After moving to the Nicaraguan Toros del Norte with whom he played in the 2016 FIBA Americas League, in January 2016 Šundov landed in Petrochimi of the Iranian League.

On January 5, 2018, Šundov signed with KK Split and returned to the Croatian Premier League.

National team career
Šundov won silver with the Croatia national basketball team at the 2001 FIBA Under-21 World Championship, averaging 10.7 points and 4.6 rebounds per game during the tournament.

Career statistics

NBA

Regular season

|-
| align="left" | 
| align="left" | Dallas
| 3 || 0 || 3.7 || .286 || - || - || .0 || .3 || .0 || .0 || 1.3
|-
| align="left" | 
| align="left" | Dallas
| 14 || 0 || 4.4 || .387|| - || 1.000 || .9 || .1 || .1 || .1 || 1.9
|-
| align="left" | 
| align="left" | Indiana
| 11 || 4 || 10.9 || .488 || .000 || .600 || 2.1 || .2 || .2 || .4 || 3.9
|-
| align="left" | 
| align="left" | Indiana
| 22 || 0 || 4.0 || .400 || -|| .000 || 1.0 || .1 || .1 || .1 || 1.5
|-
| align="left" | 
| align="left" | Boston
| 26 || 0 || 5.3 || .250 || .250 || .000 || 1.1 || .3 || .2 || .1 || 1.2
|-
| align="left" | 
| align="left" | Cleveland
| 4 || 0 || 7.3 || .333 || - || .500 || 2.5 || .0 || .0 || .0 || 2.3
|-
| align="left" | 
| align="left" | New York
| 1 || 0 || 4.0 || 1.000 || - || - || .0 || 1.0 || .0 || .0 || 2.0
|-
| align="left" | 
| align="left" | New York
| 21 || 0 || 3.5 || .297 || .333 || 1.000|| .6 || .1|| .1 || .1 || 1.2
|- class="sortbottom"
| style="text-align:center;" colspan="2"| Career
| 102 || 4 || 5.1 || .356 || .208 || .526 || 1.0 || .2 || .1 || .1 || 1.7

Playoffs

|-
| style="text-align:left;"| 2002
| style="text-align:left;"| Indiana
| 1 || 0 || 2.0 || 1.000 || .000 || .000 || .0 || .0 || .0 || .0 || 2.0
|-class="sortbottom"
| style="text-align:center;" colspan="2"| Career 
| 1 || 0 || 2.0 || 1.000 || .000 || .000 || .0 || .0 || .0 || .0 || 2.0

EuroLeague

|-
| style="text-align:left;"| 2003–04
| style="text-align:left;"| Maccabi
| 4 || 0 || 4.5 || .800 || .000 || 1.000 || 1.0 || .0 || .0 || .0 || 2.5 || 2.0
|-
| style="text-align:left;"| 2008–09
| style="text-align:left;"| Cibona
| 4 || 1 || 9.3 || .357 || .400 || 1.000 || 2.0 || .0 || .0 || .0 || 3.5 || 1.9
|- class="sortbottom"
| style="text-align:center;" colspan="2"| Career
| 8 || 1 || 7.1 || .473 || .400 || 1.000|| 1.5 || .0 || .0 || .0 || 3.0 || 1.9

References

External links
Eurobasket.com Profile
Euroleague.net Profile
ACB.com Profile
FIBAEurope Profile
Hoopshype.com Profile

1980 births
Living people
AEL Limassol B.C. players
ASK Riga players
Baloncesto León players
BC Donetsk players
Boston Celtics players
CB Lucentum Alicante players
Centers (basketball)
Cleveland Cavaliers players
Croatian expatriate basketball people in the United States
Croatian expatriate basketball people in Belgium
Croatian expatriate basketball people in Cyprus
Croatian expatriate sportspeople in Greece
Croatian expatriate basketball people in Israel
Croatian expatriate sportspeople in Latvia
Croatian expatriate basketball people in Spain
Croatian men's basketball players
Dallas Mavericks draft picks
Dallas Mavericks players
Expatriate sportspeople in Israel
Greek Basket League players
Indiana Pacers players
Israeli Basketball Premier League players
Kavala B.C. players
KK Split players
Leones de Ponce basketball players
Liga ACB players
Maccabi Tel Aviv B.C. players
Menorca Bàsquet players
National Basketball Association players from Croatia
New York Knicks players
PBC Academic players
Philippine Basketball Association imports
Rain or Shine Elasto Painters players
Basketball players from Split, Croatia
Valencia Basket players
The Winchendon School alumni
Croatian expatriate basketball people in the Philippines